Bhavapriya (meaning The one dear to Bhava (Shiva)) is a ragam (musical scale) in Carnatic music (South Indian classical music). It is the 44th Melakarta rāgam in the 72 melakarta rāgam system of Carnatic music.

It is called Bhavāni in Muthuswami Dikshitar school of Carnatic music.

Structure and Lakshana

It is the 2nd rāgam in the 8th chakra Vasu. The mnemonic name is Vasu-Sri. The mnemonic phrase is sa ra gi mi pa dha ni. Its  structure (ascending and descending scale) is as follows (see swaras in Carnatic music for details on below notation and terms):
: 
: 
(shuddha rishabham, sadharana gandharam, prati madhyamam, shuddha dhaivatham, kaisiki nishadham)

As it is a melakarta rāgam, by definition it is a sampoorna rāgam (has all seven notes in ascending and descending scale). It is the prati madhyamam equivalent of Hanumatodi (also known as Todi), which is the 8th melakarta.

Janya Rāgams
Bhavapriya has a minor janya rāgam (derived scale) associated with it. See List of Janya rāgams for full list of janya rāgams associated with Bhavapriya and other melakarta rāgams.

Compositions
A few compositions set to Bhavapriya are:

Srikanta niyeda by Thyagaraja
Maam Avasrita by Swathi Thirunal
Sentiru velan by Koteeswara Iyer
Vennai tirudi by Periyasaamy Thooran
Madhava mamava by Dr. M. Balamuralikrishna

One compositions set to Bhavani is:
Kanikarumbuto by Kalyani Varadarajan

Film Songs

Related rāgams
This section covers the theoretical and scientific aspect of this rāgam.

Bhavapriya's notes when shifted using Graha bhedam, yields two other minor melakarta rāgams, namely, Vagadheeswari and Naganandini. Graha bhedam is the step taken in keeping the relative note frequencies same, while shifting the shadjam to the next note in the rāgam. For further details and an illustration refer Graha bhedam on Naganandini.

Notes

References

Melakarta ragas